The Bride Wore Crutches is a 1941 American comedy film directed by Shepard Traube and written by Edward Verdier. The film stars Lynne Roberts, Ted North, Edgar Kennedy, Robert Armstrong, Lionel Stander and Richard Lane. The film was released on May 25, 1941, by 20th Century Fox.

Plot

Cast   
Lynne Roberts as Midge Lambert
Ted North as Johnny 'Dizzy' Dixon
Edgar Kennedy as Police Captain McGuire
Robert Armstrong as Pete
Lionel Stander as 'Flannel-Mouth' Moroni
Richard Lane as Bill Daly
Grant Mitchell as E.J. Randall
Harry Tyler as Whispers
Edmund MacDonald as Dick Williams
Horace McMahon as Brains
Anthony Caruso as Max 
Billy Mitchell as Harvey

References

External links 
 

1941 films
20th Century Fox films
American comedy films
1941 comedy films
American black-and-white films
1940s English-language films
1940s American films